Silvana Gómez Juárez (born December 6, 1984) is an Argentinian mixed martial artist who competes in the Strawweight division. She has previously competed in the Ultimate Fighting Championship.

Background
Gómez Juárez started training kung fu at the age of five due to the influence of her martial artist father, continuing to kickboxing, sanda and various other disciplines growing up. She also played rugby in Cardenales Rugby Club from where she was selected to play for the Argentina national rugby union team. She graduated from university with master's degree in physical education.

In 2019, she moved to Tijuana, Mexico to train at Entram Gym. She is also the first Argentine woman to appear in the UFC.

Mixed martial arts career

Early career
Making her debut in 2010, travelling to Bueno Aires to challenge Ana Mancinelli at Real Fights 7. After winning the bout after her opponent decided to not continue after the first round, Gómez Juárez took a break from competing to attend university in San Miguel de Tucumán, competing only once more in 2012 winning the bout by TKO stoppage in the first round. She returned to active competition at the end of 2013, she went on to fight on the Brazilian regional scene, defeating future UFC fighter Vanessa Melo via unanimous decision, before Gómez Juárez faced Poliana Botelho for the vacant XFC Women's Flyweight belt at XFCi 11. Despite knocking down Botelho and nearly submitted her in the early rounds, Gómez Juárez went on to lose the fight after a doctor stoppage between rounds. After rebounding from the loss by winning via first round TKO stoppage in Argentina, Gómez Juárez faced Ariane Lipski for the KSW Women's Flyweight Championship on March 3, 2018 at KSW 42. She lost the bout via unanimous decision.

After losing the title fight, she was booked to face Antonina Shevchenko at Dana White's Tuesday Night Contender Series 11 on June 26, 2018. However, 8 days before the fight it was announced that Gómez Juárez was forced out of the bout with an undisclosed injury and was replaced by Jaimelene Nievera.

Ultimate Fighting Championship
After racking three straight wins in the regional circuit, she was booked to compete again at Dana White's Contender Series 43 against Maria Silva on October 12, 2021. However Gómez Juárez, as a replacement for Sam Hughes, made her UFC debut against Lupita Godinez on October 8, 2021 at UFC Fight Night: Dern vs. Rodriguez. She lost the bout via armbar in the first round.

Gómez Juárez, as a replacement for Ashley Yoder, was expected to face Vanessa Demopoulos on January 15, 2022 at UFC on ESPN: Kattar vs. Chikadze. The bout was pushed back to UFC 270 a few days before the event. She lost the bout via armbar in the first round.

Gómez Juárez faced Na Liang on June 11, 2022 at UFC 275. She won the bout via knockout in the first round. This win earned her the Performance of the Night award.

Gómez Juárez faced Karolina Kowalkiewicz on November 12, 2022, at UFC 281. She lost the fight via unanimous decision.

After the loss, it was announced that Gómez Juárez was no longer under contract with the UFC.

Championships and achievements
 Ultimate Fighting Championship
Performance of the Night (One times)

Mixed martial arts record

|-
|Loss
|align=center|11–5
|Karolina Kowalkiewicz
|Decision (unanimous)
|UFC 281
|
|align=center|3
|align=center|5:00
|New York City, New York, United States
|
|-
|Win
|align=center|11–4
|Na Liang
|KO (punches)
|UFC 275
|
|align=center|1
|align=center|1:22
|Kallang, Singapore
|
|-
|Loss
|align=center| 10–4
|Vanessa Demopoulos
|Submission (armbar)
|UFC 270
|
|align=center|1
|align=center|2:25
|Anaheim, California, United States
|
|-
|Loss
|align=center| 10–3
|Lupita Godinez
|Submission (armbar)
|UFC Fight Night: Dern vs. Rodriguez
|
|align=center|1
|align=center|4:14
|Las Vegas, Nevada, United States
|
|-
|Win
|align=center| 10–2
|Gilsely Perea
|TKO (punches)
|UWC 25
|
|align=center| 2
|align=center| 3:53
|Tijuana, Mexico
|
|-
|Win
|align=center|9–2
|Diana Reyes
|TKO (punches)
|Lux Fight League 11
|
|align=center|1
|align=center|4:40
|Monterrey, México
|
|-
|Win
|align=center|8–2
|Saray Orozco
|Decision (unanimous)
|Combate 45
|
|align=center|3
|align=center|5:00
|Guadalajara, México
|
|-
|Loss
|align=center| 7–2
|Ariane Lipski
|Decision (unanimous)
|KSW 42
|
|align=center| 5
|align=center| 5:00
|Łódź, Poland
|
|-
|Win
|align=center| 7–1
|Maria Vega
|TKO (punches)
|Invictus Fighters 16
|
|align=center| 1
|align=center| 3:49
|Salta, Argentina
|
|-
|Loss
|align=center| 6–1
|Poliana Botelho
|TKO (retirement)
|XFC International 11
|
|align=center|4
|align=center|5:00
|São Paulo, Brazil
|
|-
|Win
|align=center| 6–0
|Vanessa Melo
|Decision (unanimous)
|XFC International 8
|
|align=center|3
|align=center|5:00
|Campinas, Brazil
|
|-
|Win
|align=center| 5–0
|Mayerlin Rivas
|Submission (armbar)
|XFC International 5
|
|align=center|3
|align=center|2:55
|São Paulo, Brazil
|
|-
|Win
|align=center|4–0
|Bianca Daimoni
|Submission (armbar)
|XFC International 1
|
|align=center|3
|align=center|4:49
|Osasco, Brazil
|
|-
|Win
|align=center|3–0
|Susana Diaz
|KO (punch)
|Knock Out Club 12
|
|align=center|1
|align=center|3:15
|Salta, Argentina
|
|-
|Win
|align=center|2–0
|Angelica Lobos
|TKO (punches)
|Hombres de Honor 43
|
|align=center|1
|align=center|1:40
|Santa Cruz, Argentina
|
|-
|Win
|align=center|1–0
|Ana Mancinelli
|TKO (retirement)
|Real Fights 7
|
|align=center|1
|align=center|5:00
|Buenos Aires, Argentina
|

Professional boxing record

See also 
 List of male mixed martial artists

References

External links 
  
 

1984 births
Living people
People from San Miguel de Tucumán
Argentine female mixed martial artists
Argentine women boxers
Argentine sanshou practitioners
Flyweight mixed martial artists
Strawweight mixed martial artists
Mixed martial artists utilizing sanshou
Mixed martial artists utilizing boxing
Ultimate Fighting Championship female fighters